Clémence Eme (born 24 April 1997) is a French judoka.

She won a medal at the 2021 World Judo Championships.

References

External links
 
 

1997 births
Living people
French female judoka
21st-century French women